Canadian Internal Waters is a Canadian term for the waters "on the landward side of the baselines of the territorial sea of Canada."

Definition
The baselines are defined as "the low-water line along the coast or on a low-tide elevation that is situated wholly or partly at a distance not exceeding the breadth of the territorial sea of Canada from the mainland or an island," and the territorial sea is defined as extending  from the points of the baselines, or such other points as may be prescribed.

Canada asserts that all waters within the bounds of the Canadian Arctic Archipelago, including the Northwest Passage, are within its internal waters. They also include the Strait of Juan de Fuca, Strait of Georgia, Queen Charlotte Sound and Hecate Strait, the Gulf of Saint Lawrence and the Bay of Fundy.

Canada insists that her internal waters are delimited in accordance with the rules laid out in the United Nations Convention on the Law of the Sea.

Dispute

The legal status of a section of the Northwest Passage is disputed: Canada considers it to be part of its internal waters, fully under Canadian jurisdiction according to the United Nations Convention on the Law of the Sea. The United States and most maritime nations consider them to be an international strait,
which means that foreign vessels have right of "transit passage".  In such a régime (i.e., mode of management), Canada would have the right to enact fishing and environmental regulation, and fiscal and smuggling laws, and laws intended for the safety of shipping, but not the right to close the passage.

See also

SS Manhattan (1962)

References

Geography of Canada
Disputed waters
Canadian legal terminology
Territorial disputes of Canada
Northern Canada
Coasts of Canada